The 1820–1821 United States Senate election in Pennsylvania was held on three separate dates from December 1820 to December 1821. On December 10, 1821, William Findlay was elected by the Pennsylvania General Assembly to the United States Senate.

Results
The Pennsylvania General Assembly, consisting of the House of Representatives and the Senate, convened on December 12, 1820, for the regularly scheduled Senate election for the term beginning on March 4, 1821. Two ballots were recorded on December 12. The election convention re-convened on January 16, 1821, when three ballots were recorded with no result, after which the convention adjourned sine die. Upon the expiration of incumbent Jonathan Roberts's term on March 4, 1821, the seat was vacated. It was vacant until the nomination convention of the General Assembly re-convened on December 10, 1821, and elected Democratic-Republican William Findlay to the seat. The results of the sixth and final ballot of both houses combined are as follows:

|-
|-bgcolor="#EEEEEE"
| colspan="3" align="right" | Totals
| align="right" | 126
| align="right" | 100.00%
|}

See also 
 United States Senate elections, 1820 and 1821

References

External links
Pennsylvania Election Statistics: 1682-2006 from the Wilkes University Election Statistics Project

1820-21
Pennsylvania
1820 Pennsylvania elections
Pennsylvania
1821 Pennsylvania elections